Awaiting Trial is a documentary that follows the lives of 3 people caught by the injustice of the Nigerian Police, and are held by the unfair structures of both the police and the faulty legal system. This is a story not just about systems but about the people they destroy.

Synopsis 
The 2020 #EndSARs protests in Nigeria got the attention of the world and the support of everyone from Beyoncé to Joe Biden, putting the spotlight on the worst symptom of the country’s mass incarceration problem: Awaiting Trial. That social movement grew against the backdrop of #BlackLivesMatter putting violent criminal justice systems, rising incarceration rates and police brutality on the front burner of global conversation. With the Awaiting Trial system, citizens who are caught for crimes – even for the smallest of crimes – are incarcerated without a charge for months, and years – some up to 20 years for victimless crimes and minor misdemeanour. Many of them die or disappear in prison and police custody. This is a story not just about systems and inequality, but about the people whose lives are destroyed.

It presents the devastating ramifications not just in terms of social justice and fairness, but in terms of decimating families, terrorizing communities and creating a culture of fear. The terror has not ended with two protests. Taking a behind-the-scenes interrogation of this, with never-before-seen revelations from victims, survivors, activists, police and lawyers, this documentary looks at 3 families whose members have been killed or disappeared by the police, and we tell the story of the discrimination and injustice that has destroyed their lives. Directed by Chude Jideonwo (host of the wildly popular #WithChude, a televised series of conversations, some of which have been featured in the New York Times and the BBC), Awaiting Trial was shot in Igbo, Yoruba and English.

Cast 
 Folarin Falana
 Mr. Macaroni
 Rinu Oduala
 Chude Jideonwo

Production 
Awaiting Trial was produced and directed by Chude Jideonwo with the relently launched Factual & Unscripted Content Studio- Chude Jideonwo Presents with postproduction handled by AMA Psalmist Visuals and music from Timi Dakolo and Ego Ogbaro.

Awards
 Africa International Film Festival
 Sweden Film Awards
 Florence Film Awards
 Royal Society of Television & Motion Picture Awards
 Nawada International Film Festival 4th Season

References

External links 
 

2022 films
2022 documentary films
Nigerian documentary films